Sananda is a Bengali fortnightly women's magazine published by the ABP Group from  Kolkata, India. The periodical is usually published on the 15th and 30th of every month.

History and profile
Sananda started in 1986. The first issue appeared on 31 July 1986, and was an immediate success. The magazine is printed in Bengali language. Its original print run was intended to be 30,000, but the first issue sold 75,000. It was first edited by Aparna Sen. She was succeeded by Madhumita Chattopadhyay as editor-in-chief of the magazine in 2005. The same year the magazine started its Odia edition.

References

External links 
 

1986 establishments in West Bengal
ABP Group
Biweekly magazines published in India
Women's magazines published in India
Magazines established in 1986
Mass media in Kolkata